Yang Xiaobo (born November 1971) is a former Chinese politician from Shanxi province who served as mayor of the county-level city of Gaoping. She was investigated by the Communist Party of China's anti-corruption agency in April 2014, then she was removed from office and expelled from the party in November 2014.

Early life and education 
Yang was born and raised in Yangcheng County, Shanxi. She graduated from Nankai University, majoring in economics, and in 1991 from the Southeastern Shanxi Normal College.

Career 
In 1991, Yang began to work in the Jincheng Mining Bureau. By 1995, she had been promoted to a leadership position in charge of cadre management. She served in various posts in the Organization Department of Jincheng Municipal Party Committee before becoming Deputy Secretary of the Jincheng Communist Youth League organization.

From May 2006 to May 2011, she was the head of Propaganda Department of Jinchen Urban District.

In May 2011, she was named acting mayor of Gaoping, a county-level city under the jurisdiction of Jincheng. This move was considered extremely unusual as it was rare for an official to be transferred directly from a propaganda director position one level below to a mayor position of significant power. A mouth later, she was duly confirmed as mayor. 

As mayor, she undertook a massive real estate development project with renowned Guangdong property developer Country Garden worth 2.6 billion yuan to "revitalize" the city. She was also known to have a testy relationship with then Gaoping party chief Xie Kemin. The two were said to both have "strong personalities" and often clashed. As the Shanxi political scene reverberated from a strong "earthquake" caused by the anti-corruption campaign under Xi Jinping, Xie was taken in for investigation on March 6, 2014.

Corruption allegations 
On April 30, 2014, Yang herself fell under the anti-corruption dragnet, when it was announced that she would undergo investigation by the Party's internal disciplinary body for "serious violations of laws and regulations". She was the third consecutive mayor of Gaoping to be investigated for corruption in a decade. In November 2014, she was removed from office and expelled from the party for taking "advantage of her post to seek profits for others, accepted a huge amount of money and property; and adultery".

References

1971 births
Chinese Communist Party politicians from Shanxi
Living people
Political office-holders in Shanxi
Nankai University alumni
People's Republic of China politicians from Shanxi
Politicians from Jincheng